Chaophraya Aphaiphubet (Baen) (?–1811), also known as Chaofa Talaha (Baen) or Chau Hua Pen, was a Cambodian officer, later a Siamese governor. He was known in Vietnamese contexts as Chiêu Thùy Biện (昭錘卞).

Baen was a Khmer noble with the title Oknya Yomreach (or Phraya Yommarat  in Thai). In 1782, Baen and Oknya Kalahom (Suos) captured the pro-Vietnamese regent Talaha (Mu) and had him executed. Soon Baen came into conflict with his ally, Suos. Baen assassinated Suos. Knowing Suos was killed, Cham rebels attacked Phnom Penh, forcing Baen, King Ang Eng and Oknya Kalahom (Pok) flee to Battambang then to Siam. Rama I had Ang Eng captured and deported to Bangkok. During the king's absence, Baen served as the regent and worked for Siam, and was promoted to Chaophraya Aphaiphubet.

In 1785, king Rama I sent Siamese army to attack Gia Dinh, Baen recruited 5000 Cambodian soldiers to support Siamese army. Later, he came into conflict with the Vietnamese ruler Nguyễn Ánh ("Chao Anam Kok" in Thai). He was accused by Nguyễn Ánh in 1790.

Ang Eng was allowed to return to Oudong in 1794. But the Cambodian court split into two factions, one supported Ang Eng, the other supported Baen. In order to prevent Cambodia from turmoil, Rama I ordered Baen to leave Oudong. Battambang and Siem Reap were separated from Cambodia. Baen was appointed a chao muang (governor) of this two provinces under Siamese suzerainty. He died in 1811.

Baen was also the founder of House of Abhaiwongse.

Family
Sons:
Phraya Aphaiphubet (Ros): 3rd governor of Battambang
Phra Ang Kaew (Ma): official of Cambodian court
Phra Narintharaborirak (Um): official of Battambang
Phra Yokrabat (Dom): official of Battambang
Luang Muang (Maw): official of Battambang
Luang Sachakhom: official of Muang Tanod, subordinate town of Battambang
Kong
Ket
Daughters:
Mom Yu: married a member of Siamese royal family 
Naek Thep : concubine of Ang Chan II; also mother of Princess Ang Baen 
Mee
Pok
Paen
Nuam
Mied
Kaew

See also
Cambodian–Thai border dispute

References

1811 deaths
Thai people of Khmer descent
Thai military personnel
Cambodian military personnel
Abhaiwongse family
Chaophraya